"I Want Your Sex" is a song by the English singer and songwriter George Michael. Released as a single in late May 1987 (U.S.) and early June 1987 (UK), it was the third hit from the soundtrack to Beverly Hills Cop II and the first single from Michael's debut solo album Faith. It peaked at number two in the U.S. and number three in the UK, and was a top five single in many other countries.

The single was certified platinum by the RIAA for sales in excess of two million in the United States. It was also the recipient for Golden Raspberry Award for Worst Original Song. The song's radio airplay on the BBC was restricted to post-watershed hours due to concerns that it might promote promiscuity and could be counterproductive to contemporary campaigns about AIDS awareness.

Composition
The song has three separate parts dubbed "Rhythms". The first one, titled "Rhythm One: Lust", is the version released as a single and banned by the BBC. It appears by itself on the Beverly Hills Cop II soundtrack, and mixed with the second version, titled "Rhythm Two: Brass in Love", on Faith. The second version also appears by itself as the B-side of the single. A third part, "Rhythm Three: A Last Request", appears as a B-side to the "Hard Day" 7" and "Kissing a Fool" 12" singles, and on the CD version of Faith as a bonus track. All three versions were mixed together into one 13-minute song, dubbed the "Monogamy Mix", for the 12" and CD single releases.

Writing and production
Part 1 of "I Want Your Sex" was recorded in August 1986 at Sarm West Studio 2, London, roughly 2 months after the Wham! split that June. It was written entirely in the studio, with George Michael playing all the instruments: a LinnDrum, a Roland Juno-106 and a Yamaha DX7. George explained why he wrote the track this way in International Musician and Recording World magazine:

Michael admitted that the track was "really easy to do", but it was difficult in the sense that he intended it to be a dance record, so he "had to do something new with it every 16 bars" for the song's arrangement to "hold up interest-wise".

The "squelching" bass sound heard in the song's introduction was caused entirely by accident, as engineer Chris Porter described: 

Michael himself had a similar recollection:

Parts 2 & 3 were recorded the following year during sessions at PUK Studios in Denmark as extensions to Part 1 (which had been selected for the first single), with Part 2 being the one with a "more New York club sound" (having been recorded with a seven-piece brass section), while Part 3 was the "romantic" and "altogether smoother" counterpart. For the crossover points, the 56-channel SSL console (with 28 channels on either side) at the PUK facility would be used to bounce from the original multitrack on one side of the SSL onto the new multitrack slave on the other, and George would rehearse the musicians on a particular part before dropping them in on the new track.

Music video
The music video, directed by Andy Morahan, featured Michael's girlfriend Kathy Jeung to emphasize that he was in a monogamous relationship; at one point, he is shown using lipstick to write the words "explore" and "monogamy" on her back, which is photographed and retouched at the end of the video to reveal the phrase "explore monogamy". A Spanish model was also used for naked scenes in a way that allowed the audience to assume they were the same woman; these shots are interspersed with intentionally blurred footage of George Michael dancing and singing the song.

In a 2004 interview with Adam Mattera for UK magazine Attitude, Michael reflected: "It was totally real. Kathy was in love with me but she knew that I was in love with a guy at that point in time. I was still saying I was bisexual...She was the only female that I ever brought into my professional life. I put her in a video. Of course she looked like a beard. It was all such a mess, really. My own confusion and then on top of that what I was prepared to let the public think."

The video generated controversy over its sexual themes. In 2002, MTV2's countdown of MTV's Most Controversial Videos Ever to Air on MTV included the video for "I Want Your Sex" at number 3. The original video cut appears on the Twenty Five compilation 2-DVD set.

Release
In the U.S., the song was first featured on the Beverly Hills Cop II soundtrack album, which was released to radio stations in early May 1987. The commercial release of the soundtrack followed on May 18. An immediate surge in airplay of "I Want Your Sex" as an album cut prompted CBS to release the single in the U.S. later that same month, ahead of schedule. The UK single debuted the first week of June.

"I Want Your Sex" was the second single Michael released in 1987, following "I Knew You Were Waiting (For Me)", his duet with Aretha Franklin. On the song's daytime radio ban, Michael commented during an interview with Jonathan Ross:

Despite censorship and airplay issues, an edited version of the song's music video received ample airplay on North American music channels, fueling its popularity there. The single eventually reached number 2 on the US Billboard Hot 100 chart, the week of 8 August 1987, behind "I Still Haven't Found What I'm Looking For" by U2. Moreover, the single remained in the top 10 for six weeks and the top 40 for a total of 14 weeks, becoming one of the most popular dance-pop singles of the summer of 1987. It also climbed to number 2 in Canada, where it ended up becoming the 13th most popular single of the year.

The song reached number 3 in the UK Singles Chart, where the song's reprise maintained an audience for many years thanks to BBC Radio 1 breakfast show host Simon Mayo using a looped version as backing music for his daily feature On This Day in History. It also sold 327,160 there.

Legacy
Although it was one of Michael's biggest hits, the singer ignored the song following its release; he never performed it after the Faith World Tour and although the Rhythm Two version appears on Ladies & Gentlemen: The Best of George Michael, it does not appear on the 2006 retrospective TwentyFive; furthermore, the "Monogamy Mix" does not appear on the 2011 remastered release of Faith. In an interview with Mark Goodier, included in the large-format book released with the 2011 remaster, Michael said that he still likes the second "Rhythm" but not the first, and that he distanced himself from the song because its production sounded too much like Prince; indeed, "Rhythm 1", as well as a few other tracks on the Faith album (such as "Hard Day"), features Michael simulating female vocals by artificially pitching up and altering his own voice, much the same way as Prince was doing at the time with his pseudo-female alter ego Camille. In the interview, Michael admits that he was "deeply enamoured" with Prince, and adds that he thought it was very bad for him to be infatuated with a colleague of his. Rolling Stone editor David Fricke described this song as 'a new bump-and-grind original that sounds more like Prince's stark, sexy “Kiss” than anything in the Wham! catalog'. In 2016, after Michael's death, Andrew Unterberger of Billboard ranked the song number eight on his list of Michael's 15 greatest songs.

Track listing 
7"
A. "I Want Your Sex" ("Rhythm One: Lust") – 4:44
B. "I Want Your Sex" ("Rhythm Two: Brass in Love") – 4:43

12" / CD / Cassette
A. "I Want Your Sex" (Monogamy Mix) – 13:12
"Rhythm One: Lust"
"Rhythm Two: Brass in Love"
"Rhythm Three: A Last Request"
B. "Hard Day" – 4:51

CD – 654 601-3 (UK) [1989]
 "I Want Your Sex" (Parts one and two) – 9:13
 "A Different Corner" – 3:59
 "Careless Whisper" (Extended mix) – 6:30

Freemasons Club Mix Single
 "I Want Your Sex" (Freemasons Club Mix) - 10:06

Official versions
"Rhythm One: Lust" – 4:44
"Rhythm Two: Brass in Love" – 4:43
"Rhythm Three: A Last Request" – 3:48
Monogamy Mix – 13:12
Freemasons Club Mix – 10:06
Freemasons Club Instrumental – 10:06
Freemasons Club Remix – 7:26
Freemasons Edit – 3:53
Freemasons Club Mix Edit – 3:45
Freemasons Remix – 6:51
Freemasons Vocal Club Remix – 8:07

Charts

Weekly charts
{| class="wikitable sortable plainrowheaders" style="text-align:center"
|+Weekly chart performance for "I Want Your Sex"
! scope="col"| Chart (1987)
! scope="col"| Peakposition
|-
!scope="row"|Australia (Australian Music Report)
|2
|-

|-

|-
!scope="row"|Canada (The Record'''s Retail Singles Chart)Lwin, Nanda. Top 40 Hits: The Essential Chart Guide (2000). Mississauga, Ont.: Music Data Canada
|2
|-

|-
!scope="row"|Denmark (IFPI)
|3
|-
!scope="row"|Europe (European Hot 100 Singles)
|3
|-
!scope="row"|Finland (Suomen virallinen lista)
|2
|-

|-

|-
!scope="row"|Iceland (RÚV)
| 7
|-

|-

|-

|-

|-

|-
!scope="row"|Spain (PROMUSICAE)
|4
|-

|-

|-

|-

|-

|-

|}

Year-end charts

Certifications and sales

Jipsta version
John Patrick Masterson (born 13 October 1974), known professionally as Jipsta, is an American rapper, songwriter, and music producer. Jipsta has released four full-length studio albums: Bandoozle (2011), Turnt Up (2013), Ban2oozle (2017), and most recently, Swaggerific (2019). Jipsta's unique style of layering intricate lyrics over uptempo house music beats has resulted in seven consecutive appearances on the Billboard Dance Club Songs chart since 2007. Jipsta's breakthrough moment came with the release of his third single, a progressive, genre-bending cover of the George Michael classic 80's single, "I Want Your Sex." Chris Cox (one half of the Grammy-nominated remixing duo Thunderpuss) signed Jipsta to his Provocative Music/Interhit Records label, and "I Want Your Sex" quickly hit the Billboard Dance Club Songs chart with a vengeance, with the song entering the chart as the Hot Shot Debut at number 43, and then jumping to the number 21 spot as the Power Pick in its first three weeks of release. The song climbed to the number four position on 2 May 2009, making it Jipsta's first top five Billboard single. This achievement is also noteworthy as it is the first time an openly gay white rapper earned a Billboard'' top 10 single on the Dance Club Songs chart. Jipsta filmed his first official music video in support of the single, which aired in heavy rotation on Logo's Click List Top 10 countdown as well as on Logo's NewNowNext Pop Lab program.

References

External links

1987 songs
1987 singles
Columbia Records singles
Dance-pop songs
Dutch Top 40 number-one singles
George Michael songs
Music video controversies
Music videos directed by Andy Morahan
Music videos directed by George Michael
Obscenity controversies in music
Song recordings produced by George Michael
Songs written by George Michael
Songs banned by the BBC